Eidoreus is a genus of beetles in the family Eupsilobiidae. There are at least two described species in Eidoreus.

Species
These two species belong to the genus Eidoreus:
 Eidoreus minutus Sharp, 1885
 Eidoreus politus (Casey, 1895)

References

Coccinelloidea genera
Articles created by Qbugbot